The Bert Williams Leisure Centre is a leisure centre in Bilston in the West Midlands, England, was named after the Wolves and England footballer Bert Williams. It was opened on 3 December 2011 by Wolverhamptons City’s mayor Bert Turner  with the ceremony attended by Bert Williams himself. 
The building was constructed to replace the existing swimming baths in Prouds Lane, Bilston which was opened on 27 July 1964.

The facility cost £18.6 million.

Facilities offered
The leisure centre offers the following facilities:
Swimming, (both a main pool and studio pool).  Swimming is free to under 16’s.
Sports hall
Four squash courts
Sauna
Gym
Youth gym

References 

Buildings and structures in Wolverhampton
Sports venues completed in 2011
Sports venues in the West Midlands (county)